Alexandropolis in the Thracian region of Maedians, was the first town founded in 340 BC by Alexander the Great (he was sixteen years old), after defeating a local Thracian tribe, as a regent of Macedon. Its name was chosen by analogy with Philippopolis, the town of Thrace founded by Alexander's father, Philip II. He expelled the locals and settled a mixed population. That the location of Alexandropolis is unknown suggests that a Thracian raid may have caused its disappearance from history (See Zopyrion). Tarn claims Alexandropolis was a military colony rather than a polis.

See also
List of cities founded by Alexander the Great

References

External links
Alexander the Great: his towns livius.org

Populated places in ancient Macedonia
Hellenistic colonies in Thrace
Argead colonies
Cities founded by Alexander the Great
Populated places in ancient Thrace
Former populated places in the Balkans
Lost ancient cities and towns